Langan Park, also known as Municipal Park, is a  municipal park in the Spring Hill neighborhood of Mobile, Alabama, USA. The park opened in 1957 and was named for Joseph N. Langan, a former Mobile mayor, state senator and city commissioner. It has lakes, natural spaces, tennis courts, children’s playgrounds and picnic areas. It is also the site of the Azalea City Golf Course, the Mobile Botanical Gardens, the Mobile Museum of Art and Playhouse in the Park.

Activities
The Azalea City Golf Course is an 18-hole public golf course owned and operated by the city. It opened in 1957 and has hosted Professional Golfers Association events. The Mobile Tennis Center is a public tennis facility with 50 tennis courts, all lighted and hard-court, with a professional shop and professional instruction on site.

The gardens contain a rhododendron garden with 1,000 evergreen and native azaleas and the  Longleaf Pine Habitat. The Mobile Museum of Art has European, non-Western, American and decorative arts collections.

Playhouse in the Park began in 1961 and concentrates on training young people in theatre arts. The program includes four large productions a year and consists of a training program for drama, dance, vocal, piano and scenic art classes. It also includes a traveling professional drama troupe and a full-scale puppet theatre.

Invasive species
The main lake in the park has become home to several invasive species, including the channeled applesnail and tilapia. Both are known to be very destructive to the native aquatic vegetation. Biologists speculate that the snails were most probably dumped into the lake from home aquaria. In 2009, applesnails were found downstream from the lake in Three Mile Creek, posing an immediate threat to the entire Mobile-Tensaw River Delta.

References

External links 
City of Mobile

Parks in Mobile, Alabama